Raymond Lee Daniels (born April 29, 1980) is an American Kenpoist, Karateka, Tae Kwon Do practitioner, kickboxer and mixed martial artist known for his flashy and aggressive style of fighting. He currently competes for Karate Combat in the Welterweight division. He has formely competed for Bellator MMA and Bellator Kickboxing, where he was the Bellator Kickboxing Welterweight Champion.

Background
Daniels was born in Sun Valley, California and raised in Palmdale, California. His grandfather Frankie Daniels was a professional boxer as well as a Korean War veteran and Purple Heart recipient. He began training in American Kenpo karate in 1985 under the tutelage of his father Frank Daniels and earned his black belt in 1992.

While still in high school, Daniels became a single father. Seeking a better life for him and his son, Daniels realized his boyhood dream of becoming a police officer with the Long Beach Police Department at the age of 21. After more than 7 years of service, Daniels retired to concentrate on his martial arts career.

Career
Daniels had humble beginnings as a junior competitor in sport karate competitions. By the age of 19, he would go on to become a top ranked fighter for both the National Black Belt League (NBL) and the North American Sport Karate Association (NASKA). Among his titles are eight NBL World Championships, at least two NASKA world championships, a second-place finish at the $50,000 World Pro Taekwondo Championship in Croatia in 2010, and nine overall championships at the W.A.K.O Irish Open.

Don Rodrigues, coach and co-founder of the famed Team Paul Mitchell Karate, recruited Daniels in 1999. Daniels left the Paul Mitchell Team in 2001, joining other teams in successive years.

In 2006, Daniels began fighting for Chuck Norris' World Combat League as captain of the Los Angeles Stars. Daniels fought in the 80 kg/178 lbs and 88 kg/195 lbs weight divisions, compiling a 17–0–0 (9 KO) fight record. Daniels had a highly anticipated bout with fellow undefeated kickboxing star Stephen "Wonderboy" Thompson. Daniels initially won the bout by technical knockout due to a knee injury suffered by Thompson.

Daniels defeated Peyton Russell via third-round TKO (three knockdown rule) at the K-1 World Grand Prix 2007 in Las Vegas on August 11, 2007.

Daniels defeated Michael Page at the W.A.K.O. Irish Open 2008, winning gold in the 84 kg semi-contact division.

Daniels would then set his sights on the world of mixed martial arts and was touted by Strikeforce as "the next Cung Le". On June 27, 2008, he made his MMA debut against twelve fight veteran Jeremiah Metcalf at Strikeforce: Melendez vs. Thomson. Daniels was defeated by submission via rear-naked choke in the second round.

Daniels defended his gold, in the 84 kg semi-contact division, in a rematch against Michael Page at the W.A.K.O. Irish Open 2009.

Daniels defeated Michael Page in their trilogy bout at the W.A.K.O. Irish Open 2011, securing gold in the 84 kg semi-contact division.

In his first outing under full Oriental kickboxing rules, Daniels defeated two opponents in Dublin, Ireland on October 8, 2011 to win the four man 84 kg/185 lbs tournament at the Pain and Glory event. After knocking out English Muay Thai fighter Andy Bakewell with a spinning heel kick in the semi-finals, he took a split decision over Irish kickboxer Mark Casserly in the final.

He then signed with Glory in 2013 and was set to debut at Glory 5: London on March 23, 2013 in London, England but was later removed from the card for undisclosed reasons.

Daniels defeated Brian Foster with a first-round spinning heel kick at Glory 11: Chicago - Heavyweight World Championship Tournament in Hoffman Estates, Illinois on October 12, 2013.

He replaced Marc de Bonte in the Glory 13: Tokyo - Welterweight World Championship Tournament in Tokyo, Japan on December 21, 2013 for undisclosed reasons and suffered his first kickboxing loss at the hands of Joseph Valtellini in the semi-finals. He initially caused some problems for Valtellini with his unorthodox karate style but by round two the Canadian began to hurt Daniels with low kicks. Daniels was knocked out by a high kick in the third round.

Daniels scored a spinning kick KO over François Ambang inside the opening round at Glory 16: Denver in Broomfield, Colorado, United States on May 3, 2014. His performance was hailed by Glory as the "Knockout of the Century."

On February 6, 2015, Daniels was part of a one-night, four-man welterweight tournament at Glory 19: Virginia.  In the semifinals, he faced Jonatan Oliveira and won via TKO. Daniels knocked Oliveira down with a spinning heel kick to the head in the first round and scored another knock down with a spinning kick to the body early in the second round. A knee to the groin of Oliveira led to a short intermission, after which Daniels hit Oliveira with another spinning kick to the body, forcing the TKO at 2:15 of the second round. In the finals, he faced Nieky Holzken and was knocked down early in the first round by a punch to the body. Daniels was unable to deal well with Holzken's pressure, who cut off the ring and locked Daniels up in the corners whenever possible. The second round saw Daniels being knocked down twice more, before scoring a controversial down himself in the third with one of his spin kicks. Holzken then locked Daniels up in a corner once more and knocked him down with a right hook to the head, forcing the stoppage at 1:25 of the third round after four knock downs.

He defeated Justin Baesman on May 8, 2015 in the co-main event at Glory 21: San Diego by KO (liver kick) after just 51 seconds inside the first round.

After Joseph Valtellini vacated his title due to health issues, Raymond Daniels was set to face Nieky Holzken for the welterweight world championship at Glory 23: Las Vegas on August 7, 2015. Daniels won the first two rounds on the judges scorecards due to a higher output of strikes. In the third round, Holzken managed to corner him and scored a combination which ended with a jump right knee that cut him above the eye prompting referee John McCarthy to stop the match.

On November 28, 2015, Daniels won gold at the W.A.K.O. World Championships 2015 (Dublin) in the 89 kg semi-contact division.

Bellator Kickboxing
He defeated Francesco Moricca at Bellator Kickboxing 1 on April 16, 2016 in Turin via TKO (liver kick) in the first round.

He defeated Stefano Bruno at Bellator Kickboxing 2 on June 24, 2016 in St. Louis via TKO (liver kick) in the first round.

He defeated Zsolt Benedek at Bellator Kickboxing 3 on September 17, 2016 in Budapest via unanimous decision.

He defeated Csaba Gyorfi at Bellator Kickboxing 6 on April 14, 2017 in Budapest via TKO (liver kick).

He defeated Karim Ghajji at Bellator Kickboxing 7 on September 23, 2017 in San Jose via TKO (doctor stoppage).

He defeated Giannis Boukis at Bellator Kickboxing 8 on December 9, 2017 in Florence via unanimous decision (29-28, 30–27, 30-27).

He defeated Djibril Ehouo at Bellator Kickboxing 9 on April 6, 2018 in Budapest via unanimous decision (50-44, 50–44, 50-43).

He defeated Zakaria Laaouatni at Bellator Kickboxing 11 on December 1, 2018 in Genoa via majority decision (29-29, 29–28, 29-28).

Mixed martial arts
More than a decade after his first MMA bout, Daniels returned to mixed martial arts and faced Wilker Barros at Bellator Birmingham on May 4, 2019. He won the fight via knockout in the first round.

Daniels next faced Jason King at Bellator 238 on January 25, 2020. He won the fight via TKO in the first round.

Daniels faced Peter Stanonik at Bellator 245 on September 11, 2020. The bout ended in a No Contest after multiple intentional groin kicks from Daniels rendered Stanonik unable to continue.

As the last bout of his prevailing contract, Daniels faced Peter Stanonik in an immediate rematch on April 16, 2021 at Bellator 257. He won the bout via unanimous decision.

Karate Combat 
Daniels announced that he had signed an exclusive multi-fight contract with Karate Combat. Daniels made his debut at Karate Combat 35 on August 27, 2022, where he defeated Franklin Mina via unanimous decision.

Personal life
Daniels is a father and currently lives in Orange, California. He is an instructor at World Champion Karate in Orange, California with his business partner Steven Horst. Daniels recently co-founded "ICE Martial Arts", a personal training and nutrition institute. He refrains from recreational drug use.

Daniels is married to fellow mixed martial arts fighter Colbey Northcutt, sister of Sage Northcutt, who is also a MMA fighter. Their marriage took place on August 24, 2019 in Temecula, California.

Championships and awards

Points fighting (Kickboxing/Sport Karate)
North American Sport Karate Association
2004 NASKA World Championship
2002 NASKA World Championship
National Blackbelt League
2010 NBL World Championship
2009 NBL World Championship
2008 NBL World Championship
2007 NBL World Championship
2006 NBL World Championship
2005 NBL World Championship
2004 NBL World Championship
2003 NBL World Championship
World Association of Kickboxing Organizations
2015 W.A.K.O. World Champion
2014 Irish Open Grand Champion
2012 Irish Open Grand Champion
2011 Irish Open Grand Champion
2010 Irish Open Grand Champion
2009 Irish Open Grand Champion
2008 Irish Open Grand Champion
2007 Irish Open Grand Champion
2006 Irish Open Grand Champion
2005 Irish Open Grand Champion

Kickboxing (Full Contact)
Bellator Kickboxing
Bellator Kickboxing Welterweight Championship (One time, current)
Pain and Glory
Pain and Glory -84 kg/185 lb Tournament Championship
World Combat League
2007–08 WCL Championship – with LA Stars

Taekwondo
World Pro Taekwondo Championships
2010 World Pro Taekwondo Championships Runner-up

Kickboxing record

|-  bgcolor="#CCFFCC"
| 2018-12-01 || Win ||align=left| Zakaria Laaouatni || Bellator Kickboxing 11 || Genoa, Italy || Decision (majority) || 3 || 3:00
|-
|-  bgcolor="#CCFFCC"
| 2018-04-06 || Win ||align=left| Djibril Ehouo || Bellator Kickboxing 9 || Budapest, Hungary || Decision (unanimous) || 5 || 3:00
|-
! style=background:white colspan=9 |
|-
|-  bgcolor="#CCFFCC"
|2017-12-09 || Win ||align=left| Giannis Boukis || Bellator Kickboxing 8 || Florence, Italy || Decision (unanimous)  || 3 || 3:00
|-
|-  bgcolor="#CCFFCC"
| 2017-09-23 || Win ||align=left| Karim Ghajji || Bellator Kickboxing 7 || San Jose, California, USA || TKO (doctor stoppage) || 1 || 3:00
|-
! style=background:white colspan=9 |
|-
|-  bgcolor="#CCFFCC"
| 2017-04-14 || Win ||align=left| Csaba Gyorfi || Bellator Kickboxing 6 || Budapest, Hungary || TKO (Spinning back kick) || 3 || 0:36
|-
|-  bgcolor="#CCFFCC"
| 2016-09-17 || Win ||align=left| Zsolt Benedek || Bellator Kickboxing 3 || Budapest, Hungary || Decision (unanimous) || 3 || 3:00
|-
|-  bgcolor="#CCFFCC"
| 2016-06-24 || Win  ||align=left| Stefano Bruno || Bellator Kickboxing 2 || St. Louis, Missouri, USA  || TKO (Liver kick)  || 1  || 1:45
|-
|-
|-  bgcolor="#CCFFCC"
| 2016-04-16 || Win ||align=left| Francesco Moricca || Bellator Kickboxing 1 || Torino, Italy || TKO (Liver kick) || 1 || 0:30
|-
|-  bgcolor="#FFBBBB"
| 2015-08-07 || Loss ||align=left| Nieky Holzken || Glory 23: Las Vegas || Las Vegas, Nevada, USA || TKO (Cut, doctor stoppage) || 3 || 1:36
|-
! style=background:white colspan=9 |
|-
|-  bgcolor="#CCFFCC"
| 2015-05-08 || Win ||align=left| Justin Baesman || Glory 21: San Diego || San Diego, California, USA || KO (Liver kick)|| 1 || 0:51
|-
|-  bgcolor="#FFBBBB"
| 2015-02-06 || Loss ||align=left| Nieky Holzken || Glory 19: Virginia - Welterweight Contender Tournament, Final || Hampton, Virginia, USA || TKO (4 Knockdowns) || 3 || 1:25
|-
! style=background:white colspan=9 |
|-
|-  bgcolor="#CCFFCC"
| 2015-02-06 || Win ||align=left| Jonatan Oliveira || Glory 19: Virginia - Welterweight Contender Tournament, Semi Finals || Hampton, Virginia, USA || TKO (3 Knockdowns) || 2 || 2:15
|-
|-  bgcolor="#CCFFCC"
| 2014-05-03 || Win ||align=left| François Ambang || Glory 16: Denver || Broomfield, Colorado, USA || KO (Left spinning heel kick) || 1 || 1:47
|-
|-  bgcolor="#FFBBBB"
| 2013-12-21 || Loss ||align=left| Joseph Valtellini || Glory 13: Tokyo - Welterweight World Championship Tournament, Semi Finals || Tokyo, Japan || KO (Right high kick)  || 3 || 1:20
|-
|-  bgcolor="#CCFFCC"
| 2013-10-12 || Win ||align=left| Brian Foster || Glory 11: Chicago || Hoffman Estates, Illinois, USA || TKO (Right spinning heel kick) || 1 || 2:24
|-
|-  bgcolor="#CCFFCC"
| 2011-10-08 || Win ||align=left| Mark Casserly || Pain and Glory, Final || Dublin, Ireland || Decision (Split) || 4 || 3:00
|-
! style=background:white colspan=9 |
|-
|-  bgcolor="#CCFFCC"
| 2011-10-08 || Win ||align=left| Andy Bakewell || Pain and Glory, Semi Finals || Dublin, Ireland || KO (Right spinning heel kick) || 1 || 
|-
|-  bgcolor="#CCFFCC"
| 2008-06-07 || Win ||align=left| Brandon Banda || World Combat League || New York, New York, USA || KO (spinning heel kick) || 1 || 0:55
|-
|-  bgcolor="#CCFFCC"
| 2008-06-07 || Win ||align=left| Jaime Fletcher || World Combat League || New York, New York, USA || Decision (18-5) || 1 || 3:00
|-
|-  bgcolor="#CCFFCC"
| 2008-05-03 || Win ||align=left| Scott Clark || World Combat League || Oklahoma, USA || Decision (16-9) || 1 || 3:00
|-
|-  bgcolor="#CCFFCC"
| 2008-05-03 || Win ||align=left| Chidi Njokuani || World Combat League || Oklahoma, USA || Decision (18-6) || 1 || 3:00
|-
|-  bgcolor="#CCFFCC"
| 2008-02-23 || Win ||align=left| El-Java Abdul-Qadir || World Combat League || Denver, Colorado, USA || KO (left hook and right high kick) || 1 || 2:37
|-
|-  bgcolor="#CCFFCC"
| 2008-02-23 || Win ||align=left| Chris Decaro || World Combat League || Denver, Colorado, USA || KO (spinning back kick) || 1 || 1:10
|-
|-  bgcolor="#CCFFCC"
| 2008-01-18 || Win ||align=left| Blake Lirette || World Combat League || Denver, Colorado, USA || KO (right cross) || 1 || 2:24
|-
|-  bgcolor="#CCFFCC"
| 2008-01-18 || Win ||align=left| Blake Lirette || World Combat League || Denver, Colorado, USA || Decision (15-8) || 1 || 3:00
|-
|-  bgcolor="#CCFFCC"
| 2007-12-14 || Win ||align=left| Damion Caldwell || World Combat League || Texas, USA || KO (spinning back kick) || 1 || 0:20
|-
|-  bgcolor="#CCFFCC"
| 2007-12-14 || Win ||align=left| Antoine McRae || World Combat League || Texas, USA || KO || 1 || 
|-
|-  bgcolor="#CCFFCC"
| 2007-10-19 || Win ||align=left| || World Combat League || Oklahoma, USA || DQ || 1 || 
|-
|-  bgcolor="#CCFFCC"
| 2007-10-19 || Win ||align=left| Ryan Madigan || World Combat League || Oklahoma, USA || Decision (18-6) || 1 || 3:00
|-
|-  bgcolor="#CCFFCC"
| 2007-08-11 || Win ||align=left| Peyton Russell || K-1 World Grand Prix 2007 in Las Vegas || Las Vegas, Nevada, USA || TKO || 3 || 2:20
|-
|-  bgcolor="#CCFFCC"
| 2007-01-20 || Win ||align=left| Damion Caldwell || World Combat League || Philadelphia, Pennsylvania, USA || KO (punches) || 1 || 1:57
|-
|-  bgcolor="#c5d2ea"
| 2007-01-20 || NC ||align=left| Stephen Thompson || World Combat League|| Philadelphia, Pennsylvania, USA || Knee injury|| 1 ||
|-
! style=background:white colspan=9 |originally a TKO (injury), overturned to a NC
|-
|-  bgcolor="#CCFFCC"
| 2006-09-22 || Win ||align=left| Lawrence Baker || World Combat League || Texas, USA || Decision (15-8) || 1 || 3:00 
|-
|-  bgcolor="#CCFFCC"
| 2006-09-22 || Win ||align=left| Lawrence Baker || World Combat League || Texas, USA || Decision (15-8) || 1 || 3:00 
|-
|-  bgcolor="#CCFFCC"
| 2006-03-03 || Win ||align=left| Ronnie Copeland || World Combat League || Las Vegas, Nevada, USA || KO (spinning heel kick) || 1 || 0:46 
|-
|-  bgcolor="#CCFFCC"
| 2006-03-03 || Win ||align=left| Andreas Spång || World Combat League || Las Vegas, Nevada, USA || Decision (15-7) || 1 || 3:00
|-
|-
| colspan=9 | Legend:

Mixed martial arts record

|-
| Win
|align=center|3–1 (1)
|Peter Stanonik
|Decision (unanimous)
|Bellator 257
|
|align=center|3
|align=center|5:00
|Uncasville, Connecticut, United States 
|
|-
|NC 
|align=center|2–1 (1)
|Peter Stanonik
|No Contest (accidental groin strike)
|Bellator 245
|
|align=center|2
|align=center|1:00
|Uncasville, Connecticut, United States
|
|-
|Win
|align=center|2–1
|Jason King
|TKO (punches)
|Bellator 238
|
|align=center|1
|align=center|3:07
|Inglewood, California, United States
|
|-
|Win
|align=center|1–1
|Wilker Barros		
|KO (punch)	
|Bellator: Birmingham
|
|align=center|1
|align=center|4:36
|Birmingham, England, United Kingdom
|
|-
|Loss
|align=center| 0–1
|Jeremiah Metcalf
|Submission (rear-naked choke)
|Strikeforce: Melendez vs. Thomson
|
|align=center| 2
|align=center| 0:59
|San Jose, California, United States
|

See also
 List of male kickboxers

References

External links
 
 Official site
 World Combat League Profile
 Glory profile

Living people
1980 births
American male kickboxers
American practitioners of Brazilian jiu-jitsu
Kickboxers from California
Light heavyweight kickboxers
Cruiserweight kickboxers
American male mixed martial artists
Mixed martial artists from California
Middleweight mixed martial artists
American male karateka
Mixed martial artists utilizing American Kenpo
Mixed martial artists utilizing kickboxing
Mixed martial artists utilizing Shotokan
Mixed martial artists utilizing taekwondo
Mixed martial artists utilizing Brazilian jiu-jitsu
American male taekwondo practitioners
People from Sun Valley, Los Angeles
Sportspeople from Los Angeles
People from Palmdale, California
Sportspeople from Long Beach, California
Glory kickboxers